Reigning champion Molla Bjurstedt won the singles tennis title of the 1917 U.S. Women's National Singles Championship by defeating Marion Vanderhoef 4–6, 6–0, 6–2 in the final.

Due to World War I the tournament was renamed National Patriotic Tournament in support of the war effort. No trophies were handed out to the winners and the entrance fees were dedicated to the American Red Cross. Bjurstedt was entitled to sit out the tournament and play the winner of the All Comers' competition in a challenge round but instead elected to play through and therefore no challenge round was held. The event was played on outdoor grass courts and held at the Philadelphia Cricket Club in St. Martin's, Chestnut Hill, Philadelphia in the United States, from June 18 through June 23, 1917.

Draw

All Comers' finals

References

1917 in women's tennis
1917
June 1917 sports events
1917 in American women's sports
Women's Singles
Chestnut Hill, Philadelphia
1910s in Philadelphia
1917 in sports in Pennsylvania
Women's sports in Pennsylvania